The Ordnance QF 32 pounder or (32-pdr) was a British 94 mm gun, initially developed as a replacement for the Ordnance QF 17-pdr anti-tank gun.

The only use of the 32-pounder was as the armament for the pilot vehicles of the Tortoise heavy assault tank.

Development 
Development started in October 1942, due to a General Staff order for a successor to the 17-pdr gun. Basic requirements involved the new gun to be "at least 25% more effective" than the 17-pdr. Initial focus was on development of a 55-pdr gun, although advancements in 17-pdr ammunition meant the advantages that would be secured by the 55-pdr were no longer as desirable, while the 55-pdr would suffer from considerable disadvantages such as the difficulties in the handling and stowage of ammunition. Eventually, a 3.7-inch 30-pdr gun was proposed for a standard calibre, as it had a better margin for improvement. The QF 3.7-inch anti-aircraft gun was selected as the basis for the 30-pdr anti-tank gun in September 1943 and for pilots to be built. 

During development, it was proposed that a  shot would give better performance, and this new design was trialled as the QF 37 pdr EX1 in June 1944. Following firing trials, the 37 lb shot was dropped for a  shot, and the gun was accepted as the QF 32-pdr.

At least one 32-pdr was developed as an anti-tank gun on a wheeled carriage and a single example using a novel form of muzzle brake was installed in a de Havilland Mosquito FB Mk. XVIII as an up-gunned version of the 'Tsetse', in place of the 57 mm 6-pounder Molins gun. While flight trials did not take place until after the war had ended, the aircraft flew and the gun fired without problems.

The 32-pdr gun could have easily penetrated the front hull of the Tiger II (Konigstiger) and Jagdtiger; it would have been the only allied anti-tank gun that could do so in the Second World War.

Development was halted with the end of the war: the 17-pdr was replaced by the 20-pdr for tank use, and by the 120 mm 'Battalion Anti Tank' recoilless rifle as an anti-tank artillery weapon. For infantry use it was intended to replace the 17-pdr with anti-tank guided missiles.

Ammunition
The ammunition was separate projectile and propelling charge. A number of projectiles were developed or planned including:

H.E. Mk 1	
H.E. Mk 2	
H.E. Mk 3	
APCBC/T Mk1	
APCBC/T Mk2		 	 
APCBC/T Mk3

The "T" indicated the shot had a tracer element to allow tracking it in flight.

See also 
 British standard ordnance weights and measurements

References

 Allied Secret Weapons a Purnell's History of the World Wars Special. Phoebus, 1975, (No ISBN)

World War II tank guns
World War II anti-tank guns
World War II artillery of the United Kingdom
Abandoned military projects of the United Kingdom
94 mm artillery
Tank guns of the United Kingdom